Kalateh-ye Aliabad (also Romanized as Kalāteh-ye ‘Alīābād; also known as Kalāt-e ‘Alīābād and ‘Alīābād) is a village in Arabkhaneh Rural District, Shusef District, Nehbandan County, South Khorasan Province, Iran. At the 2006 census, its population was 10, in 4 families.

References 

Populated places in Nehbandan County